Pouliot may refer to
Pouliot (surname)
Adrien Pouliot Award, presented annually by the Canadian Mathematical Society
Michel-Pouliot Gaspé Airport in Quebec, Canada